This is a list of largest reservoirs in the United States, including all artificial lakes with a capacity greater than or equal to . Figures given are for maximum storage capacity (flood pool) of reservoirs, not regular storage volume (conservation pool). This difference is significant in reservoirs such as Kentucky Lake, whose full capacity is nearly three times that of its conservation pool.

Due to sedimentation and other factors that affect a reservoir's storage capacity over time, some data listed might not accurately reflect actual current conditions in certain reservoirs.

List

Location map

See also 

List of reservoirs by volume

Notes

References